Wen Wubin (born 7 January 1997) is a Chinese footballer currently playing as a midfielder for Shaanxi Chang'an Athletic.

Career statistics

Club
.

References

1997 births
Living people
Chinese footballers
Association football midfielders
China League One players
Beijing Guoan F.C. players
Sichuan Longfor F.C. players
Shaanxi Chang'an Athletic F.C. players